Athletic Club, commonly known as Athletic Bilbao or just Athletic, is a professional football club based in the city of Bilbao in the Basque Country of Spain. They are known as Los Leones (The Lions) because their stadium was built near a church called San Mamés, which was named after Saint Mammes, an early Christian thrown to the lions by the Romans. Mammes pacified the lions and was later made a saint. The team plays its home matches at the San Mamés Stadium. Its home colours are red and white-striped shirts with black shorts.

Athletic are the fourth most successful club in La Liga with eight titles to their name. In the table of Copa del Rey titles, Athletic is second only to Barcelona, having won it 23 times. It is also the most successful Basque football club in both league and cup titles won. The club also has one of the most successful women's teams in Spain, which has won five championships in the Primera División Femenina.

The club is one of three founding members of the Primera División that have never been relegated from the top division since its inception in 1929, the others being Real Madrid and Barcelona. These three clubs, along with Osasuna, are the only four professional clubs in Spain that are not sports corporations; instead they are owned and operated by club members. Athletic's main rivals are Real Sociedad, against whom it contests the Basque derby, and Real Madrid, due to sporting and political identity; a minor rivalry also exists with Barcelona due to historical significance. At various points in the club's history, further Basque league derbies have been contested against Alavés, Eibar and Osasuna.

The club is known for its cantera policy of bringing young Basque players through the ranks, as well as recruiting players from other Basque clubs. Athletic's official policy is to sign players native to or trained in football in the greater Basque Country, which includes Biscay, Gipuzkoa, Álava and Navarre (in Spain), as well as Labourd, Soule and Lower Navarre (in France). Since 1912, Athletic has played exclusively with players meeting its own criteria to be deemed Basque. This can be seen as a unique case in European football; it has gained Athletic both admirers and critics. The club has been praised for promoting home grown players and club loyalty. The rule does not apply to coaching staff, with several examples of non-Basques both from Spain and abroad having coached the first team.

Despite the implications of the name 'Athletic Club' in English, and unlike some of the other major Spanish teams which have several departments, it is not a multi-sport club, participating only in football, although sections for cycling and other sports existed prior to the Spanish Civil War in the 1930s.

History

Bilbao FC, Athletic Club and Club Bizcaya 

Football was introduced to Bilbao by two distinct groups with British connections: British workers and Basque students returning from schools in Britain. In the late 19th century, Bilbao was a leading industrial town and attracted many migrant workers, including miners from the north-east of England and shipyard workers from Southampton, Portsmouth and Sunderland. They brought with them the game of football and came together to form Bilbao Football Club. Meanwhile, sons of the Basque educated classes, such as Juan Astorquia, went to Britain to complete their studies, and developed an interest in football, so when they returned they began to arrange games with British workers. In 1898, Juan Astorquia and 6 other students belonging to the Gymnasium Zamacois founded the Athletic Club, using the English spelling. Luis Márquez become the club's first president in 1900.

In 1901, a meeting held in the Café García established more formal rules and regulations. In 1902, founding member Juan Astorquia was elected president, ruling from 1902 until 1903. Under his presidency, Bilbao FC and Athletic formed a combined team known as Club Bizcaya, which was created to compete in the Copa de la Coronación (forerunner of the Copa del Rey which officially began a year later), and they returned with the trophy after beating Joan Gamper's FC Barcelona 2-1 in the final. On 24 March 1903, under the presidency of Juan Astorquia, Bilbao FC and its associates were officially and definitively absorbed by Athletic Club. In the same year, Basque students also formed an affiliated team, Athletic Club Madrid, which later evolved into Atlético Madrid, after watching Athletic's epic triumph in the 1903 Copa del Rey Final. The club itself declares 1898 as its foundation date.

Copa del Rey 

The club featured prominently in early Copas del Rey. Following their triumph at the Copa de la Coronación by Club Bizcaya, the newly formed Athletic Bilbao won the very first Copas del Rey in 1903, both times under Juan Astorquia who was President and Captain. In 1904, they were declared winners after their opponents failed to turn up. In 1907, they revived the name Club Vizcaya after entering a combined team with Union Vizcaino. After a brief lull, they won again in 1910, with Luis Astorquia as the new captain and goalkeeper. In 1911, former team captain Alejandro de la Sota, was elected as the 7th president of the club, and he was the driving force behind the construction of the San Mamés Stadium, which opened in 1913 and soon become one of the symbols of Athletic's dominance in the 1910s, winning the Copa del Rey three times in a row between 1914 and 1916. The star of this team was Pichichi, a prolific goalscorer who scored the very first goal at the San Mamés  on 21 August 1913 and a hat-trick in the 1915 final, before dying aged just 29 in 1922. Today, the La Liga top-scorer is declared the Pichichi in his honour.

The first La Liga 

Along with fellow Basque clubs such as Real Unión, Arenas Club de Getxo and Real Sociedad, Athletic was a founding member of La Liga in 1928 and by 1930 they were joined by CD Alavés; five of the ten clubs in the Primera División were from the Basque Country. The saying "Con cantera y afición, no hace falta importación", translated as "With home-grown teams and support, there is no need for import", made sense during these early days.

The Fred Pentland Era 

In 1921, a new English coach, Fred Pentland, arrived; in 1923, he led the club to victory in the Copa del Rey. He revolutionised the way Athletic played, favouring the short-passing game. In 1927, Pentland left Athletic but returned in 1929 and led the club to La Liga/Copa del Rey doubles in 1930 and 1931. The club won the Copa del Rey four times in a row between 1930 and 1933 and they were also La Liga runners-up in 1932 and 1933. In 1931, Athletic defeated Barcelona 12–1, the latter's worst-ever defeat.

The league title under Garbutt 
Athletic's success under English coaches continued with William Garbutt. His first season in Spain was a massive success as he managed to win the Liga that year. He had inherited a talented squad which included strikers Guillermo Gorostiza and Bata.

Garbutt promoted the young Ángel Zubieta to the first team, a player who at 17 years of age went on to become the youngest ever to play for the Spanish national team at the time. In the final game of the season, the title was decided when Athletic defeated Oviedo 2–0 at home on 19 April 1936, winning the title just two points clear of Real Madrid. In July 1936, football halted due to the outbreak of the Spanish Civil War. The league did not restart until the 1939–40 season. Athletic Club did not win the title again until 1943 and by that time Garbutt had been exiled.

Atlético Bilbao 

In 1941, the club changed its name to Atlético Bilbao, following a decree issued by Franco. The same year Telmo Zarra made his debut. He went on to score 294 goals in all competitions for Athletic. His 38 goals in the 1950–51 season stood as a record for 60 years.

In 1943, the club won a double and retained the Copa in both 1944 and 1945. During the early 1950s, the club featured the legendary forward line of Zarra, Panizo, Rafa Iriondo, Venancio and Agustín Gaínza. They helped the club win another Copa del Generalisimo in 1950. Coach Ferdinand Daučík led the team to another double in 1956 and to more Copa victories in 1955 and 1958. In 1956 the club also made their debut in the European Cup.

The 1960s were dominated by Real Madrid, and Atlético only had a single Copa del Rey win in 1969, although the decade saw the emergence of a club legend, José Ángel Iribar.

The 1970s were not much better, with only another single Copa del Rey win in 1973. In December 1976, before a game against Real Sociedad, Iribar and Sociedad captain Inaxio Kortabarria carried out the Ikurriña, the Basque flag, and placed it ceremonially on the centre-circle – this was the first public display of the flag since the death of Francisco Franco. In 1977, the club reached the final of the UEFA Cup, only losing on away goals to Juventus. By then the Franco regime also ended and the club reverted to using the name Athletic.

The Clemente years 
In 1981, Javier Clemente became manager. He put together one of the most successful teams in the club's history. In 1983 the club won La Liga, and in 1984 they won a La Liga/Copa del Rey double. In 1985 and 1986, Athletic finished third and fourth respectively. Clemente's Athletic acquired notoriety for its aggressive style of play. The club has failed to win a major trophy since the success of the era. A succession of coaches that included José Ángel Iribar, Howard Kendall, Jupp Heynckes and Javier Irureta and even a returning Clemente failed to reproduce his success.

The Fernández era 
In 1998, coach Luis Fernández led the club to second in La Liga and UEFA Champions League qualification. Fernández benefited from the club adopting a more flexible approach to the cantera. In 1995, Athletic had signed Joseba Etxeberria from regional rivals Real Sociedad, causing considerable bad feeling between the two clubs. Etxeberria was a prominent member of the 1997–98 squad, along with Rafael Alkorta and Julen Guerrero.

21st century 
The club narrowly avoided relegation during the 2005–06 and 2006–07 seasons, the latter being the worst in the club's history. In the Copa del Rey, they reached their first final in 24 years, losing 4–1 to Barcelona.

Prior to the 2011–12 season, Athletic's new president, former player Josu Urrutia, brought in coach Marcelo Bielsa; Athletic advanced to their first European final since 1977, losing 3–0 to Spanish rivals Atlético Madrid on 9 May in the 2012 UEFA Europa League Final at the Arena Națională in Bucharest. They also reached the 2012 Copa del Rey Final, losing again to Barcelona.

After star midfielder Javi Martínez moved to FC Bayern Munich, Athletic were eliminated from the 2012–13 Europa League group stage, and were knocked out of the Copa del Rey by Basque club Eibar of the third tier. Relegation was a threat until the end of the season, and the final league game at the "old" San Mamés ended in defeat. Athletic would soon move to a new stadium, albeit in a partially completed state. Bielsa promoted young defender Aymeric Laporte into the side, while striker Fernando Llorente completed a free transfer to Juventus.

After Bielsa, Ernesto Valverde returned for a second spell as manager, and he signed or brought through several new players as Athletic came fourth in the league, meaning a UEFA Champions League campaign. Ander Herrera transferred to Manchester United for €36 million deal at the end of the season.

Athletic had a triumphant first full-capacity match in the new San Mamés as they defeated Napoli to qualify for the Champions League group stage, however they could only finish 3rd in the group. Athletic reached the 2015 Copa del Rey Final, but once again lost to Barcelona, 3–1.

In the first leg of the 2015 Supercopa de España at San Mamés, Athletic defeated Barcelona 4–0, with Aritz Aduriz scoring a hat-trick. In the return leg at Camp Nou, Athletic hung on with a 1–1 draw to win their first trophy since 1984. Aduriz finished with 36 goals in all competitions. Athletic advanced to the quarter-finals in the Europa League where they were only defeated on penalties by the holders and eventual repeat winners Sevilla FC.

Valverde left his position at the end of the 2016–17 season after four years. It was confirmed that his successor would be former player José Ángel Ziganda, moving up from Bilbao Athletic. On 29 November the club suffered a shock defeat to SD Formentera in the domestic cup. At the conclusion of a poor season overall, Ziganda was dismissed and Eduardo Berizzo was appointed. However, his spell was even less fruitful and in December 2018, having won just two of his fifteen matches at the helm and with the team in the relegation zone, Berizzo was dismissed. B-team coach Gaizka Garitano took over and oversaw an improvement in results, with the club moving well out of danger and narrowly missing out on a Europa League spot on the last day.

The beginning of the 2019–20 season saw more consistent results. After the first five games of the season, the Lions sat at the top of the table, their best start in 26 years. That form could not be maintained, and by the halfway point they had slipped to mid-table after several draws. However, in the Copa del Rey, they survived two penalty shootouts against second-tier opponents and then defeated Barcelona to reach the semi-finals. The club then defeated Granada CF in the semi-final on away goals to meet local rivals Real Sociedad in the final – which was then postponed due to the COVID-19 pandemic in Spain, both clubs happy to delay in the hope of supporters being able to attend the historic Basque derby occasion. This did not come to pass, and the final was eventually played in an empty stadium in 3 April 2021, Real Sociedad emerging winners by a 1–0 scoreline. By that time, Aduriz had finally retired from playing, Garitano had been replaced as coach by Marcelino, and the 2020–21 Supercopa de España originally intended to follow the delayed cup final was contested, Athletic defeating Real Madrid then Barcelona to claim the trophy. They also defeated Levante in the semi-final of the 2020–21 Copa del Rey to reach the final on 17 April 2021, making them the only team to take part in the showpiece event twice in as many weeks; however, Athletic lost that final as well, to Barcelona by a 4–0 scoreline. In October 2021, a report from the International Centre for Sports Studies (CIES) showed that Athletic Bilbao and Desna Chernihiv (Ukraine) were the only teams in European continental competitions without foreign players.

Club colours 

Athletic began playing in an improvised white kit, but in the 1902–03 season, the club's first official strip became half-blue, half-white shirts similar to those worn by Blackburn Rovers, which were donated by Juan Moser. Later, a young student from Bilbao named Juan Elorduy, who was spending Christmas 1909 in London, was charged by the club to buy 25 new shirts, but was unable to find enough. Waiting for the ship back to Bilbao and empty handed, Elorduy realised that the colours of the local team Southampton  matched the colours of the City of Bilbao, and bought 50 shirts to take with him. Upon arriving in Bilbao, the club's directors decided almost immediately to change the team's strip to the new colours, and since 1910, Athletic Club have played in red and white stripes. Of the 50 shirts bought by Elorduy, half were then sent to Atlético Madrid, where Elorduy was a committee member and a former player; it had originally begun as a youth branch of Athletic Bilbao. Before the switch from blue and white to red and white, only one other team wore red and white, Sporting de Gijón, since 1905.

Athletic were one of the last major clubs who did not have the logo of an official sponsor emblazoned on their kit. In the UEFA Cup and the Copa del Rey of 2004–05, the shirt sported the word "Euskadi" in green in exchange for hundreds of thousands of euros from the Basque Government (Red, white and green are the Basque colours).
This policy was changed in 2008, when Athletic made a deal with the Biscay-based Petronor oil company to wear their logo in exchange for over €2 million. In 2011, Athletic revealed a new away kit that was inspired by the Basque flag. The Kutxabank logo now adorns the front of Athletic's kits.

Between 2001 and 2009 Athletic also manufactured their own playing kit, under the brand 100% Athletic and utilising the small design from their centenary celebrations as a manufacturer's logo.

Crest

Athletic's shield has incorporated the escutcheons of Bilbao and Biscay. From the shield of Bilbao, it takes the bridge and the church of San Anton, and the wolves from the powerful Haro family, who were lords of Biscay and founders of Bilbao in 1300. From the shield of Biscay, it takes the Gernikako Arbola (Guernica's tree) and the cross of Saint Andrew (saltires). Its first documented use dates from 1922.

The first official club crest was a blue circle surrounded by a belt with the letters A and C in the centre in white (as the club colours were at that point). The second was from 1910, consisting of a red-and-white flag (newly adopted as the shirt colours) with a red square in the top left corner, containing the initials of the club in white. The third, from 1913, involved the same flag, but in this case shown on a pole wrapped around a football (this is very similar to the Real Sociedad crest still in use today, ignoring the crown of royal patronage).

The first version of the current crest, roughly an inverted triangular shield shape with a section of red-and-white stripes and a section of local motifs, is from 1922; this was a really simple version which was adapted several times, some of which closely resembled the crest of Atlético Madrid, originally a branch of the Bilbao club. Finally, in 1941 the first version of the current shield was created, but the name "Atlético Bilbao" was used when General Francisco Franco outlawed all non-Spanish names during his fascist reign. In 1972, the club added full colour to the design and recovered the original English "Athletic Club" name. In 2008, the shape of the shield was slightly altered and a new "Athletic Club" typeface was introduced.

Players

Current squad 
.

Reserve team

Out on loan

Coaching staff

Presidency 

The current club president (elected in June 2022, following Aitor Elizegi) is Jon Uriarte.

The board of the Athletic Club is composed of the following directors:

 President: Jon Uriarte.
 Vice-President: Mikel Martínez.
 Secretary: Fernando San José.
 Vice-Secretary: María Tato.
 Treasurer: Aitor Bernardo.
 Accountant: Jon Ander de las Fuentes.
 Board members: Begoña Castaño, Goyo Arbizu, Itziar Villamandos, Óscar Beristain, Joana Martínez, Iker Goñi, Óscar Arce, Ricardo Hernani, Tomás Ondarra, Jorge Gómez, Manu Mosteiro. 
 Managing Director: Jon Berasategi.
 General Secretary: Juan Ignacio Añibarro.
 Sporting Director: Rafael Alkorta.

Coaches

Kit evolution

Kit suppliers and shirt sponsors

Honours

League
La Liga (8): 1929–30, 1930–31, 1933–34, 1935–36, 1942–43, 1955–56, 1982–83, 1983–84

Cups
Copa del Rey (23): 1903, 1904, 1910, 1911, 1914, 1915, 1916, 1921, 1923, 1930, 1931, 1932, 1933, 1943, 1944, 1944–45, 1949–50, 1955, 1956, 1958, 1969, 1972–73, 1983–84
Supercopa de España (3): 1984, 2015, 2020–21
Copa Eva Duarte: 1950
Copa de la Coronación: 1902

Women's football

Results 

Pos. = Position; Pld = Matches played; W = Matches won; D = Matches drawn; L = Matches lost; GF = Goals for; GA = Goals against; Pts = Points

Statistics and records

Statistics 

Institutional information:

 Associates: 44,171
 Official fans groups: 452
 Budget: €101,940,138 (2018–19 season).
 TV income: €71,000,000 (2016–17 season)

Best positions

 Seasons in La Liga: all.
 Best position in La Liga: 1st (8 times)
 Worst position in La Liga: 17th (once)
 Historical position in the ranking of La Liga: 5th
 Best position in UEFA Champions League / European Cup: Quarter-finals (1956–57)
 Best position in UEFA Europa League / UEFA Cup: Runners-up (1976–77, 2011–12)
 Entries in UEFA competitions: 32 (as of 2017–18 season)
 5 participations in the UEFA Champions League / European Cup
 18 participations in the UEFA Europa League / UEFA Cup
 2 participations in the UEFA Cup Winners' Cup
 6 participations in the Inter-Cities Fairs Cup
 1 participation in the UEFA Intertoto Cup

Goals records

 Most goals scored in one match home: Athletic 12 – Barcelona 1 (1930–31).
 Most goals scored in one match away: Osasuna 1 – Athletic 8 (1958–59).
 Most goals scored in one match in Copa del Rey: Athletic 12 – Celta Vigo 1 (1946–47)
 Most goals scored in one match in European competitions:  Standard Liège 1 – Athletic 7 (2004–05).

Players records

 Top scorer of club history: Telmo Zarra (367 goals)
 Most games played: José Ángel Iribar (614 matches)
 Most titles won by the club: Guillermo Gorostiza (15 titles)
 Youngest player to debut (amateur): Domingo Acedo (16 years old)
 Youngest player to debut (professional): Iker Muniain (16 years old)
 Youngest goalscorer (amateur): Domingo Acedo (16 years old)
 Youngest goalscorer (professional): Iker Muniain (16 years old)
 Oldest player to retire: Armando Ribeiro (39 years old) 
 Oldest goalscorer: Aritz Aduriz (38 years old)
 Most expensive player signing: Iñigo Martínez (signed in 2018 for €32M from Real Sociedad)
 Most expensive player sold: Kepa Arrizabalaga (sold in 2018 for €80M to Chelsea)

Records 
 Together with Real Madrid and Barcelona, Athletic is one of only three teams to have contested all editions of La Liga, without ever having been relegated.
 In the 1929–30 season, finished the league unbeaten after 18 games.
 Has the record for the biggest win in La Liga (12–1 to Barcelona, in 1931).
 Has the record for the biggest win in Copa del Rey (12–1 to Celta Vigo, in 1947).
 Has the record for the biggest win away to Real Madrid (0–6 in Santiago Bernabéu), Barcelona (0–6 in Camp Nou), Espanyol (1–5) and Osasuna (1–8).
 Telmo Zarra is the only player in the history of La Liga to be top scorer six times.
 Zarra is the top scorer in the history of Copa del Rey (81 goals).
 Gaínza has the record of most goals scored in a single La Liga match (8 goals).
 Zarra holds the record for most goals in a Copa del Rey final (4 goals).

Stadium information

San Mames 
Name: San Mamés
Nickname: La Catedral (The Cathedral)
City: Bilbao
Opened: September 2013
Capacity: 53,289
Beginning construction: 25 May 2010.
End construction (partial): September 2013.
End construction (total): August 2014.
Pitch size: 105 m × 68 m (344 ft × 223 ft)
Sports Facilities: Lezama

Lezama facilities 

The Lezama Facilities is the complex where all of the categories of Athletic train. It was opened in the 1971–72 season, under the presidency of Felix Oráa. At present, facilities include, inter alia, five natural grass fields, a gymnasium, a pediment, a medical center and a residence for young players. Lezama has undergone remodeling since 1995 under the presidency of José María Arrate with the construction of new roads and parking entry and exit able to absorb the large number of vehicles that come every day, and a platform cover bringing greater convenience to fans attending the matches of the youth teams and other youth football teams.

These facilities are located in the municipality of Lezama, approximately ten miles from Bilbao.

Future 
The Board has given the green light to the so-called "Lezama Master Plan", which was founded with the purpose of modernizing the structures of both the youth teams and first team. The "Plan" is the result of a rigorous study of the basic needs for the future of the Athletic Club. The work will take place over the course of two to three years and its budget is around €12 million. The Club is committed to consolidate its cantera structure, which is the basis for the future of the Club and in this regard Lezama will be expanded to classrooms for youth work in the lower categories and create an audiovisual department.

See also 

Bilbao Athletic – B team in Segunda División B
CD Basconia – affiliate team for under-20 players in Tercera División
Athletic Bilbao cantera – youth system up to 19 years, in leagues including División de Honor Juvenil
Athletic Bilbao (women) – women's team in the Primera División Femenino
List of Athletic Bilbao records and statistics
One Club Award – an annual award organised by Athletic that honours players who only represented one club over the course of their career.
Politics and sports

References

Notes

External links

Official websites

Athletic Club at La Liga
Athletic Club at UEFA

 
La Liga clubs
Football clubs in the Basque Country (autonomous community)
Copa del Rey winners
Sports teams in Bilbao
Unrelegated association football clubs
Association football clubs established in 1898
1898 establishments in Spain